Line Monty, born as Éliane Serfati, also known by her stage name Leïla Fateh (1926 in Algiers – 19 August 2003 in Paris), was a Jewish Algerian singer who sang in Arabic and French.

Career
 She first appeared on a short movie by Alberto Spadolini Nous, les Gitanes in 1950. In 1952 she started recording on Pathé Marconi's behalf.

A collection of her recordings of Arabic and French songs was released as Trésors de la chanson Judéo-Arabe - Line Monty in France in the early 1990s.

Awards and honours
She gained the Prix Edith Piaf and won the Prix d'Olympia.

References

2003 deaths
Algerian Jews
Jewish singers
20th-century Algerian women singers
Jewish women musicians
Year of birth uncertain
21st-century Algerian people